Maria Kirchgasser (born 26 November 1970) is an Austrian snowboarder, born in Radstadt. She competed in women's parallel giant slalom at the 2002 Winter Olympics in Salt Lake City.

References

External links

1970 births
Living people
People from Radstadt
Austrian female snowboarders
Olympic snowboarders of Austria
Snowboarders at the 2002 Winter Olympics
Sportspeople from Salzburg (state)